Vernon Wasley Rowe (11 March 1896 – 23 November 1929) was an Australian rules footballer who played with Melbourne in the Victorian Football League (VFL).

Notes

External links 

Australian rules footballers from Victoria (Australia)
Melbourne Football Club players
Footscray Football Club (VFA) players
1896 births
1929 deaths